The Fokker V.2 and V.3 aircraft were developed from the Fokker V.1, but utilized an 89 kW (120 hp) Mercedes liquid-cooled inline engine instead of the rotary. This is similar to the Fokker V.6 being tested as the Fokker V.5 was being developed. Like the V.1, the fuselage was circular in cross section, and the wings were covered with plywood. To match the center of pressure and center of gravity with the heavier engines, these aircraft had their upper wing's outboard sections swept back.

For many decades, the V.3 was thought to be a modification to the V.2 instead of a separate aircraft. The designation was known, and assigned in error to the first triplane, which also had cantilever wings. That aircraft was, however, the V.4, not the V.3.

A period photo in the book German Combat Planes, authored by Ray Wagner and Heinz Nowarra and published in the United States in 1971, shows a "Fokker V.2" aircraft with a redesigned empennage strongly reminiscent of the Albatros D.III in appearance, as a possible step in its experimental program.

Historian Peter M. Bowers has speculated that the V.1-V.3 were in fact proof of concept aircraft as they were too under-powered for actual use as fighters.

Bibliography

1910s German fighter aircraft
V.02
Biplanes
Single-engined tractor aircraft